In ecological theory, the Hutchinson's ratio is the ratio of the size differences between similar species when they are living together as compared to when they are isolated. It is named after G. Evelyn Hutchinson who concluded that various key attributes in species varied according to the ratio of 1:1.1 to 1:1.4.

See also
Hutchinson's rule

References

External links

Ecology